The Party of the People (PDG) is a Chilean political party, characterized as a center-right to right-wing and populist. It was created at the end of 2019, being legalized by the Electoral Service on July 26, 2021. It is led by 2013 and 2021 presidential candidate Franco Parisi, and by the founder of "Felices y Forrados" Gino Lorenzini.

At the time of its legalization in July 2021, the party had about 43,000 members, the second largest number of members of any party in Chile after the Communist Party. Among its adherents is the conventional constituent-elect Rodrigo Logan of district 9.

History 
It was founded on December 13, 2019, domiciled in the city of Santiago. Its founders are economists Franco Parisi (who was an independent candidate in the 2013 presidential election) and Gino Lorenzini, and many of its adherents were members of the presidential command of Parisi called "The Power of the People-Social Movement Franco Parisi".

Lorenzini, on the other hand, was the founder of Felices y Forrados, a pension advisory company that tried to bring independent candidates to the 2021 Chilean Constitutional Convention election that were rejected by the Electoral Service (Servel) for failing to comply with the rules of financing of politics. According to press releases, Lorenzini could be PDG presidential candidate for the 2021 election.

On May 28, 2021, they announced the collection of 35 thousand signatures, which would allow them to register as a political party in the 16 regions of the country, if Servel validates the rubrics. On the same day, 30,258 signatures were submitted to Servel to register the community in all regions of the country. Later, Lorenzini and Parisi gave their support to the collection of signatures for the legalization of the United Centre party, with whom they seek to develop a joint list of parliamentary candidacies. On July 26, Servel accepted the application for registration of the party in all regions of Chile.

2021 presidential candidacy 
On August 11, 2021, Gino Lorenzini announced that he would present an independent candidacy for the presidency of the Republic, the product of a break within the party due to differences with Franco Parisi, thus leaving the collectivity. The party planned to hold an internal digital primary between Lorenzini and Parisi to define its presidential candidate, a method that was rejected by Lorenzini arguing that he will go as a candidate whatever the outcome.

After announcing his candidacy, Lorenzini said that “the option with which the PDG became a party grew so much ambition that this dictatorship began to be implemented. The ambition grew so much that they went crazy with the quotas of deputies and senators, and the bases are divided, so instead of uniting we are being divided.” After learning that he is collecting signatures as an independent, the PDG issued a statement in which they stated: “Gino decided to start a personal option, and he distances himself from our project.” In this context, Lorenzini published days later through Felices y Forrados that if his political militancy is ratified before the Servel, he will go to the PDG primaries, and called to leave behind the divisions between his adherents and those of Parisi.

Criticism 
The party has been defined as catch-all and populist, in addition to trying to use the label of "independent", appealing to the concept of the "people" to capitalize on political support. Daniel Jadue of the Communist Party has criticized the party's voters calling them "individualistic" and "only concerned about having more money in their pockets".

Governance 
Party authorities are:

 President: Luis Moreno Villablanca
 Vice President: Jorge Luis Passadore Soto
 General Secretary: Luis Emilio Peña Rojo
 Treasurer: Rafael Huenchuñir Gatica
 National Coordinator: Christian Cid Barahona
 Executive Secretary: Gloria Vera Rubio

Presidential candidates 
The following is a list of the presidential candidates supported by the Party of the People. (Information gathered from the Archive of Chilean Elections). 
2021: Franco Parisi (lost)

Electoral history

Presidential election

Congress election

References

External links 

Right-wing populism in South America
Political parties established in 2019
Political parties in Chile
2019 establishments in Chile